Ron Rozelle is an American author of ten books of fiction and nonfiction, including 'Description & Setting: Techniques and Exercises for Crafting a Believable World of People, Places & Events', a volume in the Writers Digest 'Write Great Fiction' series; 'The Windows of Heaven', a novel of the 1900 Galveston storm; 'A Place Apart', a novel set in modern day Ohio; and 'Warden: Death and Life in the Texas Prison System', coauthored with Jim Willett, Rozelle's memoir, 'Into That Good Night', the first non-agented property published by New York’s venerated Farrar, Straus, & Giroux in over five years, was a national short list finalist for the P.E.N. Prize and the Carr P. Collins Award and was selected as the second-best work of nonfiction in the nation for the year 1998 by the San Antonio Express-News. He has taught writing workshops at numerous conferences and universities and was twice the memoir teacher at the Newman National Writer’s Conference at Mississippi College.  His articles have appeared in a wide variety of publications, and he has been a featured author at the Texas Book Festival in Austin and the Texas Folklife Festival in San Antonio.  'Touching Winter', a novel made up of a quartet of stories, was published in October, 2005, by TCU Press and was a short list finalist for The Texas Institute of Letters Best Fiction of the Year Prize.  'My Boys and Girls are in There: The 1937 New London School Disaster' (Texas A&M University Press) was the recipient of the Calvert Prize, was pronounced the “sleeper hit” of the 2012 Texas Book Festival, and was a short list finalist for the Best Nonfiction Award given by the Writers’ League of Texas. 'Sundays with Ron Rozelle', a collection of his newspaper columns, was published by TCU Press in 2009. His most recent book, 'Exiled: The Last Days of Sam Houston', was published by Texas A&M University Press. A graduate of Sam Houston State University, Class of 1977, he holds degrees in English and Political Science and was  named the 2017 SHSU Distinguished Educator of the Year, the highest honor given to alumni of the College of Education. In 2007 he was inducted into the Texas Institute of Letters.

Ron Rozelle taught English and Creative Writing for forty years before retiring in 2017, and is currently a professor at the Women's Institute of Houston where he teaches writing courses.  In addition to doing his own writing he teaches writing workshops occasionally, provides reader reports on submitted manuscripts for several publishers, and consults with writers on their projects.  He and his wife, also a retired teacher, are happy grandparents and live in Pearland, a suburb of Houston, with an opinionated elderly cat.

Works
 Into That Good Night (Farrar, Straus, Giroux, 1998) (Trade Paper edition: Texas Review Press, 2000)
 The Windows of Heaven: A Novel of Galveston's Great Storm of 1900 (Texas Review Press, 2000)
 A Place Apart (Texas Review Press, 2001)
 Warden: Prison Life and Death From the Inside Out (with Jim Willett, Bright Sky Press 2004)
 Touching Winter: A Novel in Four Parts (Texas Christian University Press, 2005)
 Write Great Fiction: Description & Setting: Techniques and Exercises for Crafting a Believable World of People, Places, and Events (Writer's Digest Books, 2005)
 Sundays With Ron Rozelle (TCU Press, 2009)
 My Boys and Girls Are in There:  The 1937 New London School Disaster (Texas A&M University Press, 2012)
 Exiled: The Last Days of Sam Houston (Texas A&M University Press, 2017)

References

Living people
Writers from Texas
Writers of books about writing fiction
Year of birth missing (living people)